Moslemabad (also Romanized as Moslemābād) is a village in Qohrud Rural District, Qamsar District, Kashan County, Isfahan Province, Iran. At the 2006 census, its population was 62, in 22 families.

References 

Populated places in Kashan County